Vladimir Aleksandrovich Krasnov (born 19 August 1990) is a Russian track and field sprinter.

International competitions

See also
List of stripped European Athletics Championships medals

References

 

1990 births
Living people
People from Bratsk
Sportspeople from Irkutsk Oblast
Russian male sprinters
Olympic male sprinters
Olympic athletes of Russia
Athletes (track and field) at the 2012 Summer Olympics
Universiade gold medalists in athletics (track and field)
Universiade gold medalists for Russia
Medalists at the 2013 Summer Universiade
World Athletics Championships athletes for Russia
European Athletics Championships winners
European Athletics Championships medalists
Russian Athletics Championships winners
21st-century Russian people